The Israel Halperin Prize is awarded every five years by the Canadian Annual Symposium on Operator Theory and Operator Algebras to a member of the Canadian mathematical community who has recently obtained a doctorate and has made contributions to operator theory or operator algebras. It honors Israel Halperin, the founder of a group of researchers in operator algebras and operator theory at the University of Toronto who strongly influenced the field across Canada. First awarded in 1980.

Recipients 
The recipients of are:

 1980: Man-Duen Choi
 1985: Kenneth R. Davidson
 1985: David Handelman
 1990: Ian F. Putnam                         
 1995: Nigel Higson                         
 2000: Guihua Gong                         
 2000: Alexandru Nica                         
 2010: Andrew Toms                         
 2015: Serban Belinschi                         
 2015: Zhuang Niu
 2020: Matthew Kennedy
 2020: Aaron Tikuisis

See also

 List of mathematics awards

References 

Mathematics awards